Denver and Rio Grande Depot may refer to:

Denver and Rio Grande Depot (Montrose, Colorado)
Denver and Rio Grande Western Depot (Salt Lake City)